The 1923 Hong Kong Sanitary Board election was supposed to be held on 11 December 1924 for an elected seat in the Sanitary Board of Hong Kong.

The election was held for two of the elected seats on the board due to the resignation of Filomeno Maria Graca Ozorio. J. C. Macgown was elected to the Board uncontested.

References

1924 elections in Asia
1924 in Hong Kong
Sanitary
Uncontested elections
December 1924 events
1924 elections in the British Empire